Lake Musters and Lake Colhué Huapí (at altitudes of around ) form the terminal stage of the Senguerr River endorheic basin, located in the patagonic central region of Argentina in the south of Chubut province. Closest populated area is Sarmiento, an 8,000 inhabitant former Welsh immigrant colony. The lakes gave their names to the Mustersan and Colhuehuapian South American land mammal ages.

Description

Inflow 
The basin lakes are fed mainly by the eastward running Senguerr river which begins its journey in the glacial lakes La Plata and Fontana in the Andes. The inflow ranges from 35 to 54m³/sec and varies seasonally and yearly greatly.

Outflow 
Both lakes have naturally a high evaporation process in the dry Patagonian environment by means of strong winds action and solar radiation. In shallow Colhué Huapi evaporation is much increased. In past decades, when excessive inflows did take place, water discharged to the birth branches of Chico River and eventually reached Chubut River. This occasional process last happened in 1939, since then Chico River is mostly a dry one.

Lake Musters 
This lake, once called Otrón by the ancient tehuelches, received its current name in 1876 from naturalist and geographer Francisco Pascasio Moreno who aimed to honour the Patagonian adventurer George Chaworth Musters.

Musters occupies a Cretaceous conformed depression in the central Patagonic mesa in the Golfo San Jorge Basin. It receives the highly branched inflow of Senguerr river by its southern coast after a  voyage from the Andes. Several of those branches reach lake Colhué Huapí by a sinuous course called Falso Senguerr; the only permanent one feeding such lake.

It is considered mesotrophic, based on its nutrient and algae mass (<). Musters presents an abundant aquatic fauna comprising Patagonian perch (Percichthys trucha) and patagonian silversides (Odontesthes microlepidotus). Also, as is the case with most Patagonian lakes, foreign salmonidae have been implanted, like Salvelinus fontinalis, rainbow trout, and in lesser amounts, Salmo fario. These species have added environmental pressure over two native species nowadays endangered in the lake (Diplomystres viedmensis mesembrinus and Galaxias platei).

Lake Colhué Huapí 
The name of this large water mirror comes from the Mapuche language Mapudungun. Colhué means "reddish or red place" and Huapí means "island". It is a reference to one of the many clay conformed islands of such lake. The lake was named in official Argentine cartography by explorer Francisco Moreno who reached the lake in 1876. Subsequent analysis have shown that Moreno appear to have mistaken it for the larger General Carrera Lake whom indigenous Tehuelches called Coluguape. 

Colhué Huapi fills a shallow depression formed by strong eolean action over an area of fine clays. It is fed by the Falso Senguerr river, a sinuous branch of main Senguerr River. The lake coast is dominated by extensive wetlands mainly at its feeding zone.

It is considered an argilotrophic brackish water lake because of its high levels of inorganic sediments in suspension. As with lake Musters, and despite the high water opacity, Patagonian perch and silversides have large populations. Of high interest is the native big mouth perch (Percichthys colhuehuapensis) currently endangered by pressure of human-introduced foreign salmonidae.

Environmental concerns 
Several water offtakes have been progressively placed at lake Musters for drinking water supply, as well as many diversions of the Senguerr river to feed oil extraction facilities in the nearby region. This complicated the already resented water balance of the whole system to the extent of near-collapse at Colhué Huapí, whose peripheral surface continuously retracts and dries. 
The hydrological equilibrium of the whole basin has been negative in the past seventy years. Currently these lakes' situation could be defined as compromised.

References

External links 
 Photos of Lake Musters
 Lakes Muster, Colhué Huapí and Senguerr River - tourism information

Musters
Colhué Huapí